Igor Golovkov (born May 17, 1990) is a Russian professional ice hockey defenceman who currently plays for HC Vityaz of the Kontinental Hockey League (KHL).

References

External links

1990 births
Living people
Drummondville Voltigeurs players
HC Dynamo Moscow players
Ice hockey people from Moscow
Russian ice hockey defencemen
HC Vityaz players